Raggare  is a subculture found mostly in Sweden and parts of Norway and Finland, and to a lesser extent in Denmark, Germany, and Austria. Raggare are related to the American greaser and rockabilly subcultures and are known for their love of hot rod cars and 1950s American pop culture. Loosely translated into English, the term is roughly equivalent to the American "greaser", English "rocker", and Australian "Bodgie" and "Widgie" culture; all share a common passion for mid-20th-century American cars, rockabilly-based music and related fashion (blue-collar in origin, consisting of the likes of white T-shirts, loose fitting denim trousers with rolled cuffs, and canvas top sneakers such as Keds or Converse Chucks, or low-topped boots of an industrial nature).

While the raggare movement has its roots in late 1950s youth counterculture, today it is associated mainly with middle-aged men who enjoy meeting and showing off their retro American cars. However, the subculture retains its rural and small-town roots as well as its blue collar and low brow feel. The original phenomenon unleashed moral panic but the contemporary raggare subculture tends to be met with amusement or mild disapproval by mainstream society.

Description

Influences
The Raggare subculture's influences are American popular culture of the 1950s, such as the movies Rebel Without a Cause with James Dean, and American Graffiti.

Cars
Cars are an important part of the subculture, especially V8-powered cars and other large cars from the United States. Statistically, the most common raggare car is the 1960s Pontiac Bonneville. They are plentiful, classic, relatively cheap, and have a huge backseat so the Raggare can pile in all of their friends. Raggare have been described as closely related to the hot rod culture, but while hotrodders in the US have to do extensive modifications to their cars to stand out, raggare can use stock US cars and still stand out compared to the more sober Swedish cars. Some raggare also drive European cars from the 1950s, 1960s and the 1970s.

According to an estimate by one Swedish car restorer, there are more restored 1950s American cars in Sweden than in the entire United States and although only two 1958 Cadillac convertibles were sold in Sweden there are now 200 of them in Sweden. Between 4000 and 5000 classic US cars were at one point imported to Sweden each year.

The latest generation of raggare, the so-called pilsnerraggare such as the club Mattsvart who was the subject of the 2019 documentary "Raggarjävlar" ("Greaser scum") do not show much interest in restoring vintage cars, instead opting for driving around in trashed old US cars, drinking alcohol and playing loud music, not necessarily the rockabilly and classic rock traditionally preferred by raggare.

Fashion
The clothes and hairstyle are that of 1950s rockabilly. Blue jeans, cowboy boots, white T-shirts, sometimes with print (also used to store a pack of cigarettes by folding the sleeve), leather or denim jacket. The hair is styled using Brylcreem or some other pomade.

Symbols
The display of the battle flag of the Confederate States is popular in the subculture, as followers embrace the supposedly "rebellious" message of the flag, despite the misuse of the flag at racist and right-wing events.

History 
Formation of the raggare culture was aided by Sweden staying neutral during World War II and untouched by the war. As a result, Sweden's infrastructure remained intact and export economy boomed, which made it possible for the working-class Swedish youth to buy cars, in contrast to most of Europe, which needed to be rebuilt.

When raggare first appeared in the 1950s, they caused a moral panic with concerns about the use of alcohol, violence, high-speed driving, and having sex in the back seat. Raggare gangs were seen as a serious problem. The film Raggare! covered the issue in 1959.

One especially infamous raggare gang was Stockholm-based "Road Devils", formed in the late 1950s by Bosse "Gamen" Sandberg (1939-1994), which was very heavily publicized in the press. The name of the gang originated from a 1957 movie Hot Rod Rumble, which featured a gang by the same name. When other gangs managed to get facilities in the city, the Road Devils had too bad reputation.

Later, raggare often got into fights with hippies and punks, something described in the punk rock song "Raggare Is a Bunch of Motherfuckers" by Rude Kids (and later re-recorded by Turbonegro). When The Sex Pistols played in Sweden on 28 July 1977, a group of raggare waited outside and cornered some young girls who came out from the show. The girls had safety pins through their cheeks, and the raggare ripped them out of their faces. The band was upstairs drinking beer when they heard about it. Sid Vicious wanted to go down and fight, and someone else suggested they should get the limousine and run them over. In the end, the gig promoter called the police.
The Hjo band Reklamation was forced to cancel a gig after threats from raggare. Also, Rude Kids was forced to cancel a sold-out gig as the police didn't have the manpower to offer protection against raggare. When Rude Kids played in Stockholm the police had to bring in seven police cars to stop the raggare. When The Stranglers played in Sweden, their followers were caught making Molotov cocktails, and the police intervened after a fight broke out.

In 1996, the Swedish post office issued a stamp featuring raggare.

Public image 

Because of their mostly rural roots, retro-aesthetics and attitude towards sex, raggare are often depicted as poorly educated and financially unsuccessful. A famous example is the 1990s TV series, "Ronny and Ragge", a pair of stereotypical raggare who cruise around in a beat-up Ford Taunus. There are several periodic gatherings for raggare around Sweden. The Power Big Meet is the most famous, and is also one of the biggest American car meets in the world.

In the media and other popular culture 
In 1975, then glam rocker Magnus Uggla made the song "Raggarna", which was a tribute to the culture. When performing live in late 1970s and early 1980s, raggare threw rocks and tried to thrash the arenas in which Uggla performed, accusing him of being a punk rocker due to his success with the more punk-oriented albums he released in the late 1970s.
Eddie Meduza have performed songs like "Punkjävlar" ("Punk Bastards"), or "Ragga runt," a tribute to the Raggare subculture.
Rude Kids made a song about raggare (later re-recorded by Turbonegro) called "Raggare Is a Bunch of Motherfuckers", as an answer to "punkjävlar" by Eddie Meduza. The large number of punk songs about raggare shows the conflict between the two subcultures.
The 1959 film Raggare! was about raggare and the moral panic of the time.
The TV series Ronny and Ragge is about two raggare who cruise around in a beat-up 1976 - 1994 Ford Taunus.
Onkel Kånkel made a song about raggare behaviour during cruising called "Åka femtitalsbil" (later covered by Charta 77).
 The early Swedish punk band P.F. Commando has issued a song called "Raggare" on their 1978 Svenne Pop 7-inch EP
 Raggargänget (1962) with Ernst-Hugo Järegård and Sigge Fürst
 Massproduktion published a compilation album titled Vägra Raggarna Bensin – Punk Från Provinserna.
 On 1 May 1979 about 100 punks formed their own parade down Kungsgatan under the slogan "Vägra raggarna bensin ("Refuse the raggare gasoline").
 Nadja's brothers "Roffe", "Ragge" and Reinhold, Bert
 Tjenare Kungen (2005)
 In Welcome to Sweden, Bengt is a raggare, and delighted to meet his niece's American boyfriend because of it.
 Raggarjävlar (2019) is a documentary about the new generation of raggare in the club Mattsvart from Köping

See also 
 Atlanticism
 Bōsōzoku
 Deep South
 Gopnik
 Greaser (subculture)
 Harry
 Kustom Kulture
 Mods and Rockers
 Neo-Confederate
 Nozem
 Rednecks
 Rockabilly
 Rockers
 Special Relationship
 Teddy Boyjens
 Transatlantic relations, relating to the assimilation of American and Canadian cultures into a pan-European soil. 
 White trash

References

External links 

 
  Cultural Imperialism or Hyper-Americanization – Swedish raggare and Chicano Lowriders – article by Scott Holmquist
 Raggare video guide
 Raggare – @The Movie
 Photos from Power Big Meet by Frank Aschberg
 Stadin Raggarit – Finnish Raggare site Over 6000 pictures and many articles (in Finnish), etc.
 Punktjafs: Raggare – music and period articles about punks and raggare

Swedish culture
Transport culture
Musical subcultures
Working class in Europe
1950s cars